Johan Brunström and Andreas Siljeström were the defending champions but chose not to defend their title.

Purav Raja and Divij Sharan won the title after defeating Santiago González and Artem Sitak 6–4, 6–4 in the final.

Seeds

Draw

External Links
 Main Draw

BNP Paribas Primrose Bordeaux - Doubles
2017 Doubles